is a roguelike created by Mark R Johnson. It was started in 2011 and was intended to be a ten-year project, and has returned to active development since December 2020 after several years without a release. The game takes place in a procedurally generated world around the time of the scientific revolution. It is about "uncovering an intellectual conspiracy to rewrite history in the most culturally, religiously and socially detailed procedural world ever generated", and the game's core technical objective is "nothing short of the procedural generation of culture".

Gameplay 

Ultima Ratio Regum is presented in a roguelike manner with ANSI characters and features permadeath. Unlike most roguelikes, Johnson has stated that combat itself will not be the main source of difficulty, and the game is instead focused around a kind of cultural detective-work wherein the player pieces together clues from the world's generated culture, history, religions, social norms, etc, to "uncover an intellectual conspiracy to rewrite history". The whole world is procedurally generated, from solar systems (the macro scale) to small details like tombstone engravings which are displayed with generated ANSI graphics (the micro scale). Puzzles are also generated anew each game and scattered around the world, to ensure that they are "not so easily spoiled by a wiki". The game does extensive procedural generation of aesthetics and graphics, ranging from tables and chairs to ornate vases and religious altars.

Civilizations have different policies that affect the player to varying degrees. NPCs have their faces generated in ANSI according to their civilization's genetic features and social norms (earrings, tattoos), and can be viewed ingame so the player may figure out the social class or origin of an NPC. There is no consistent cultural style, so in one game tattoos might be worn by people in lower-class districts, while in another one they might be a distinct feature of the ruling class.

Development

Developer 
Mark R Johnson is currently a Lecturer in game studies at the University of Sydney. After his undergraduate degree in politics and sociology, he studied for a PhD in science and technology studies from 2011 to 2014. He is also an ex-professional poker player.

Influence 
According to Johnson, Jorge Luis Borges, who "wrote a lot about themes which resonate with roguelikes but haven't been fully explored", Umberto Eco and Neal Stephenson were all inspirations for Ultima Ratio Regum.

References

External links 
 

2012 video games
Freeware games
Indie video games
Roguelike video games
Strategy video games
Video games developed in Canada
Windows games
Windows-only games
Video games using procedural generation